The 2008 Los Angeles Sparks season was the 12th season for the Los Angeles Sparks. The Sparks returned to the postseason for the first time since 2006.

Offseason
The following player was selected in the Expansion Draft: 
 LaToya Thomas Los Angeles Sparks

WNBA Draft
 On October 23, 2007. The WNBA draft lottery was held. The Los Angeles Sparks received the first pick for the upcoming 2008 WNBA Draft.

Transactions
April 24, The Sparks waived DeTrina White.
April 23 The Sparks waived Layla Schwarz due to injury.
April 22, The Sparks traded Taj McWilliams-Franklin and a first-round pick in the 2009 WNBA Draft to the Washington Mystics for DeLisha Milton-Jones.
April 21 The Sparks signed Tiina Sten to a training camp contract.
April 17 The Sparks signed Vaida Sipaviciute to a training camp contract.
April 15 The Sparks signed Lady Comfort to a training camp contract.
April 2 The Sparks signed Olympia Scott to a training camp contract.
March 6, The Sparks signed Layla Schwarz, Liron Cohen and Brisa Silva to training camp contracts.
February 22 The Sparks signed free agent Marie Ferdinand-Harris.
February 21 The Sparks signed Jessica Moore and Raffaella Masciadri to training camp contracts.

Preseason

Regular season

Candace Parker
Candace Parker scored 34 points, and set a league record for the most points in a WNBA debut. Parker added 12 rebounds to help the Los Angeles Sparks beat the defending champion Phoenix Mercury 99–94 on Saturday 17. Parker, narrowly missed a triple-double with 12 rebounds and eight assists. The previous high in a WNBA debut was 25 points by Cynthia Cooper in 1997.
On May 29 against the Indiana Fever, Parker tallied the first-ever "5x5" performance in WNBA history, posting 16 points, 16 rebounds, six blocked shots, five assists and five steals. Parker had a career-best 40-point performance on July 9 against the Houston Comets.
On June 22, Candace Parker of the Los Angeles Sparks finished a breakaway late in a game against the Indiana Fever with a one handed slam. This marked just the second time that a player in the history of the WNBA had a slam dunk.

Malice at the Palace

The Sparks–Shock brawl (also known as The Malice at the Palace II) was an altercation that occurred in a game between the Detroit Shock and Los Angeles Sparks on July 21, 2008, at The Palace of Auburn Hills. With 4.2 seconds before the game was officially over, the fighting began on the court after Plenette Pierson made a hard block out after a free throw on Candace Parker. This was the second brawl to occur at the Palace, the other being the Pacers–Pistons brawl.

Season standings

Season schedule

Player stats
Note: GP= Games played; MIN= Minutes; REB= Rebounds; AST= Assists; STL = Steals; BLK = Blocks; PTS = Points; AVG = Average

Roster

Playoffs

Awards and honors
 Lisa Leslie, All WNBA First Team
 Lisa Leslie, Led WNBA, Blocks (2.9 per game)
 Lisa Leslie, All-WNBA Defensive First Team
Candace Parker, WNBA Rookie of the Year
Candace Parker, WNBA MVP
 Candace Parker, Forward, All-WNBA Rookie Team
Candace Parker, Hanns-G 'Go Beyond' Rookie of the Month award in May (For the month of May, she averaged 19.2 points, 11.5 rebounds and 6.3 assists in four games)
Candace Parker, Hanns-G 'Go Beyond' Rookie of the Month award in July (In the 12 games played in July she averaged 20.8 points, 9.5 rebounds per game and collected eight double-doubles)
Candace Parker, Led WNBA in double-doubles (17)
Candace Parker, Led WNBA Rookies, Points per game (18.5) 
Candace Parker, Led WNBA Rookies, Blocks per game (2.3) 
Candace Parker, Led WNBA Rookies, Minutes per game (33.6) 
Candace Parker, Led WNBA, Rebounds per game (9.5)

References

Los Angeles Sparks seasons
Los Angeles
Los Angeles Sparks